TTC is a French hip hop group from Paris. It consists of Tido Berman, Teki Latex, Cuizinier, Orgasmic, Para One, and Tacteel. In 2007, Les Inrockuptibles described it as "one of the most fascinating developments in French music of the past ten years."

History
In 2002, TTC released the first album, Ceci N'est Pas Un Disque, on Big Dada. In 2004, the group released the second album, Batards Sensibles. It featured vocal contributions from Busdriver and Radioinactive. The third album, 3615 TTC, was released in 2006.

Members
 Tido Berman - vocals
 Teki Latex - vocals
 Cuizinier - vocals
 Orgasmic - DJ
 Para One - production
 Tacteel - production

Discography

Studio albums
 Ceci N'est Pas Un Disque (2002)
 Batards Sensibles (2004)
 3615 TTC (2006)

EPs
 Elementaire  (2001)
 Danser (2002)
 Trop Singe (2003)
 Girlfriend (2006)

Singles
 "Game Over 99" b/w "Trop Frias" (1999)
 "Leguman" b/w "Subway" (2000)
 "De Pauvres Riches" (2003)
 "Dans Le Club" (2004)
 "Telephone" b/w "Paris, Paris" (2006)
 "Travailler" (2007)

Guest appearances
 DJ Vadim - "L'art D'ecouter" from U.S.S.R. The Art of Listening (2002)
 Para One - "Beat Down" from Beat Down EP (2003)
 Stacs of Stamina - "Donne Moi Un Poisson" from Tivoli (2005)
 Modeselektor - "Dancingbox" from Hello Mom! (2005)
 Daedelus - "Cadavre Exquis" from Exquisite Corpse (2005)
 Kid Rolex - "Trop in Love" (2006)
 Para One - "Musclor" from Epiphanie (2006)
 dDamage - "Feed the Fish" from Shimmy Shimmy Blade (2006)
 Mr. Flash – "Champions" (2006)
 Ghislain Poirier - "Pour Te Rechaufffer" from Rebondir EP (2006)
 Radioclit - "Mature Macho Machine" (2006)
 Modeselektor - "2000007" from Happy Birthday! (2007)
 Edit - "Crunk De Gaulle" from Certified Air Raid Material (2007)

References

External links
 

Alternative hip hop groups
French hip hop groups
French electronic music groups
Musical groups from Paris